Percy Ewing Matheson  (23 January 1859 – 11 May 1946) was an author and honorary fellow of New College, Oxford.

Matheson's wife Elizabeth was a daughter of Henry Bruce, 1st Baron Aberdare, and predeceased her husband in 1935.

Selected works
 A skeleton outline of Roman history (1885) 
 (transl.) The Theory of the State by Johann Caspar Bluntschli (1885)
 National ideals (1915) 
 (transl.) Epictetus. The Discourses and Manual, together with fragments of his writings in 3 vols. (1916)
 Holy Russia and Other Poems (1918) 
 The growth of Rome (1922)

References

External links
 
 

English writers
1859 births
1946 deaths
People from Nottingham
Alumni of Balliol College, Oxford